is a passenger railway station located in the town of Fukusaki, Kanzaki District, Hyōgo Prefecture, Japan, operated by West Japan Railway Company (JR West).

Lines

Station layout
The station consists of one side platform and one island platform connected to the station building by a footbridge. The station is staffed.

Platforms

Adjacent stations

|-
!colspan=5|West Japan Railway Company

History
Fukusaki Station opened on July 26, 1894.  With the privatization of the Japan National Railways (JNR) on April 1, 1987, the station came under the aegis of the West Japan Railway Company.

Passenger statistics
In fiscal 2016, the station was used by an average of 1733 passengers daily.

Surrounding area
 Hyogo Prefectural Fukusaki High School

See also
List of railway stations in Japan

References

External links

  

Railway stations in Hyōgo Prefecture
Bantan Line
Railway stations in Japan opened in 1894
Fukusaki, Hyōgo